Microsoft Works is a productivity software suite developed by Microsoft and sold from 1987 to 2009. Its core functionality included a word processor, a spreadsheet and a database management system. Later versions had a calendar application and a dictionary while older releases included a terminal emulator. Works was available as a standalone program, and as part of a namesake home productivity suite.  Because of its low cost ($40 retail, or as low as $2 OEM), companies frequently pre-installed Works on their low-cost machines. Works was smaller, less expensive, and had fewer features than Microsoft Office and other major office suites available at the time.

Mainstream support for the final standalone and suite release ended on October 9, 2012 and January 8, 2013, respectively.

History
Microsoft Works originated as MouseWorks, an integrated spreadsheet, word processor and database program, designed for the Macintosh by ex-Apple employee Don Williams and Rupert Lissner. Williams was planning to emulate the success of AppleWorks, a similar product for Apple II computers. Bill Gates and his Head of Acquisitions, Alan M. Boyd, convinced Williams in 1986 to license the product to Microsoft instead. Initially it was to be a scaled-down version of Office for the (then) small laptops such as the Radio Shack TRS-80 Model 100 which Microsoft was developing. As laptops grew in power, Microsoft Works, as it was to be called, evolved as a popular product in its own right.

On September 14, 1987, Microsoft unveiled Works for DOS. The initial version 1.x of Works ran on any PC with at least 256k of memory. Works 2.x, introduced in 1990, required 512k and 3.x, introduced in 1992, required 640k.

In 1991, Microsoft issued the first Windows version of Works, titled MS Works for Windows 2.0. System requirements consisted of Windows 3.0, a 286 CPU, and 1MB of memory. Works 3.x in 1993 moved to requiring Windows 3.1, a 386 CPU, and 4MB of memory. Subsequent releases were for Windows 95 and up and the final version was Works 9.x in 2007, requiring Windows XP or Vista, 256MB of memory, and a Pentium 4 CPU.

Microsoft released Macintosh versions of Works starting with Works 2.0 in 1988. The version numbering roughly followed that of Windows releases.

Through version 4.5a, Works used a monolithic program architecture whereby its word processor, spreadsheet and database documents ran in windows of the same program interface. This resulted in a small memory and disk footprint, which enabled it to run on slower computers with requirements as low as 6 MB of RAM and 12 MB free disk space. It also provided a mini version of Excel for DOS systems as a DOS version of that program was not available. Works 2000 (Version 5.0) switched to a modular architecture which opens each document as a separate instance and uses the print engine from Internet Explorer.

Version 9.0, the final version, was available in two editions: an advertisement-free version, available in retail and for OEMs, and an ad-supported free version (Works SE) which was available only to OEMs for preinstallation on new computers.

In late 2009, Microsoft announced it was discontinuing Works and replacing it with Office 2010 Starter Edition, although it replaced only the word processor and spreadsheet components but not the calendar or the database.

Features

Microsoft Works has built-in compatibility for the Microsoft Office document formats ( and ), including, but not limited to, the ability of the Works Word Processor to open Microsoft Word documents and the ability of the Works Spreadsheet to open Microsoft Excel workbooks. Newer versions include task panes but do not include significantly updated features. Even in the final version (Version 9.0), the Windows 95-era icons and toolbars were not updated to make them consistent with later application software.

Version 4.5a is particularly noted in this respect. The database management system, while a "flat file" (i.e., non-relational) allows the novice user to perform complex transformations through formulas (which use standard algebraic syntax and can be self-referential) and user-defined reports which can be copied as text to the clipboard. A 'Works Portfolio' utility offers Microsoft Binder-like functionality.

By installing the 2007 Office System Compatibility Pack, the Works Word Processor and Spreadsheet can import and export Office Open XML document formats, although they are converted rather than being operated upon natively. The Works Calendar can store appointments, integrates with the Windows Address Book, as well as Address Book's successor, Windows Contacts, and can remind users of birthdays and anniversaries. It supports importing and exporting iCalendar files. It does not support subscribing to iCalendar files or publishing them online via WebDAV. Up to version 8, using the Works Task Launcher, the calendar and contacts from Windows Address Book could be synchronized with portable devices. In Works 9.0, the sync capability has been removed.

File format compatibility and other issues
Microsoft (at least at some time in the past) made file format conversion filters for Microsoft Word for opening and saving to Works Word Processor format. At least at some time in the past, Microsoft Office Excel could import newer Works Spreadsheets because the newer Works Spreadsheet also used the Excel format but with a different extension (*.xlr). There is an import filter for older Works 2.0 spreadsheet format (*.wks); however it may be disabled in the registry by newer Microsoft Office Service packs. As far as Works Spreadsheet 3.x/4.x/2000 (*.wks) and Works database (any version of *.wdb) files were concerned, in the past, Microsoft did not provide an import filter for Excel or Access. There are third party converters available for converting these filetypes to Excel spreadsheets: For database files (*.wdb) there was also a donateware utility; for spreadsheet (*.wks) and database (*.wdb) files a commercial solution was available (at least apparently in 2008).

A general C++ library, libwps, can extract text from many different versions of Microsoft Works. LibreOffice, NeoOffice and OxygenOffice have included libwps. libwps also provides a command line converter.

One commercially available solution for converting to and from Microsoft Works files on the Macintosh platform apparently in 2016 was the MacLinkPlus product from DataViz. Free online conversion services in 2016 were also available.

Works Spreadsheet and Works Database are unable to handle more than 500 fonts installed in Windows and throw error messages.

Version history

Works for MS-DOS
 Microsoft Works 1.12
 Microsoft Works 1.5
 Microsoft Works 2.0 and 2.00a
 Microsoft Works 3.0, 3.0a and 3.0b

Works for Mac OS
 Microsoft Works 1.0
 Microsoft Works 2.0
 Microsoft Works 3.0
 Microsoft Works 4.0

Works for Microsoft Windows
 Microsoft Works 2.0 and 2.0a (Windows 3.x)
 Microsoft Works 3.0, 3.0a and 3.0b (Windows 3.x)
 Microsoft Works 4.0, 4.0a, 4.5 and 4.5a (Windows 95)
 Microsoft Works 2000 (v.5)
 Microsoft Works 6.0 – Last version for Windows 95
 Microsoft Works 7.0 – Last version for Windows 98 (Original release)
 Microsoft Works 8.0 – Last version for Windows 98 SE/Me/2000 – Fully compatible with Windows XP and Windows Vista, Windows 7 and later versions of Windows.
 Microsoft Works 8.5 (Free update for Works 8.0, Microsoft Works Suite 2005 and Microsoft Works Suite 2004 users)
 Microsoft Works 9.0 – First version fully compatible with all versions of Windows Vista, fully compatible with later versions of Windows

Works Suite
In 1997, Microsoft introduced Microsoft Home Essentials, which packaged several of its home productivity titles into a single suite that was sold for a then low price described in a review by the Chicago Tribune as "one of the best bargains ever offered." Home Essentials continued to evolve and, beginning with the 1999 edition, took the namesake of Works, becoming Works Suite.  A slimmer version of the suite, dubbed Works Deluxe, was also offered for that year, but discontinued thereafter.

As the programs within Works Suite were developed separately and sold individually, each had a unique look and feel.  They were integrated by a task plane, which picked the appropriate program for the user to accomplish each task.  In addition to the core programs, each version of Works Suite also included programs such as FoneSync in 2001, and PowerPoint Viewer beginning in 2003.  Later editions of Works Suite prompted users to upgrade to more featured versions of the included programs at a discounted rate.

In addition to retail sales, Works Suite was included with the purchase of a new computer by several manufacturers, notably Dell and Gateway.  Works Suite was discontinued after the 2006 edition.  Works was later bundled with Word as Works Plus 2008, but this was made available only to OEMs.

Comparison of bundled Works home productivity suites:

See also

 Lotus 1-2-3

References

Works
Office suites
DOS software
Classic Mac OS software
1988 software
Computer-related introductions in 1988
Products introduced in 1988